"Sex" is the second single from German industrial metal group Oomph! from their album, Sperm.

Music video
The music video shows the band half-naked, playing the song in a dark studio (though lightened with reflectors) and scenes featuring separately two pairs - an old and a young couple - both naked.

Track listing
 Sex (Radio Per-Version)
 Sex (Club Penetration Mix)
 Sex (Angel-Grinder Remix)

1994 singles
Oomph! songs
1994 songs
Songs written by Dero Goi